Desmond John Wilcox (21 May 1931 – 6 September 2000) was a British television producer, documentary filmmaker, journalist and television executive. He worked at the BBC and ITV during his career and was producer of series such as This Week, Man Alive, and That's Life!.

Early life
Wilcox was born in 1931 in Welwyn Garden City, Hertfordshire, England, to John Wallace Wilcox, a student of architecture under Sir Edwin Lutyens, becoming partner in architectural firm Anderson, Forster, Warren and Wilcox (later Anderson, Forster and Wilcox) and a Second lieutenant in the Royal Engineers, and Alice May, née Whittle. He attended Cheltenham Grammar School and Christ's College, Finchley. He was then a training apprentice with the Outward Bound Sea School and left home to work as a deckhand in the merchant marine.

Career

Journalism 
In 1949 Wilcox began a career in journalism as a reporter on a weekly newspaper. After two years of national service, he moved to Fleet Street to work for the Daily Mirror, becoming a foreign correspondent in the New York bureau.

In 1960 Wilcox moved to television as a reporter on ITV's This Week current affairs programme, where he stayed for five years until joining the BBC.

Documentaries 
He was co-editor and presenter of the landmark Man Alive series in 1965. He later formed the Man Alive Unit as well as providing the distinctive voice-over in the weekly current-affairs programme TEMPO directed by Mike Hodges.

In an interview in 1986 he said:

Television executive 
From 1972 to 1980 he was head of general features at the BBC. He made series including Americans, The Visit, Black in Blue and A Day in the Life.

Personal life 
Wilcox married firstly Patsy Price, and they had three children together called Claire, Adam, and Cassandra. During this first marriage he had an eight-year affair with television presenter Esther Rantzen, and in 1977 he married her after obtaining a divorce from Patsy. There were three further children of this marriage, including the television presenter Rebecca Wilcox. In 1992 Wilcox converted to Judaism, the religion of his second wife.

Later life 
After he left the staff of the BBC, Wilcox was involved in the occasional series following the story of David Jackson (David Lopez) 'the Boy David', a badly-deformed Peruvian boy (a sufferer of noma) whose face was rebuilt by a Scottish surgeon who adopted him. The series won six international awards.

Death 

Wilcox died of a heart attack in Paddington, London, in 2000, aged 69.

Awards
Wilcox was posthumously awarded the Grierson Documentary Film Awards Life Tribute in November 2001.
A media arts centre at a High School in Rainhill, Merseyside has been opened, named in his honour.

Coat of arms

Sources
Esther Rantzen, The Autobiography, BBC Worldwide, 2001

References

External links
 Obituary
 

1931 births
2000 deaths
Converts to Judaism
British documentary film producers
English documentary filmmakers
English Jews
People from Welwyn Garden City
20th-century British businesspeople